Crawford University is a private Christian University in Igbesa, Ogun state in Nigeria, owned by the Apostolic Faith Mission.

History 

Crawford University was established in 2005 by Paul Akazue, the then leader and third Overseer for the Apostolic Faith work across Africa. Rev. Paul Akazue was the Proprietor and the first installed Chancellor of the Crawford University, before his death in May 2010.

Vice Chancellors 
 Professor Moses Toye Ige (June 2005 - September 2010)
 Professor Samson Ayanlaja (October 2010 - September 2015)
 Professor Isaac Rotimi Ajayi  FNIP (October 5, 2015 - October 4, 2020) 
 Professor Reuben Jiya Kolo (October 2020 – Present)

References

External links
Crawford University website
Crawford University Portal
Nigeria: Western Delta Varsity Takes Off in Oghara
 https://web.archive.org/web/20100527205255/http://www.apostolicfaith.org/NewsEvents/PastorsJournal/tabid/109/PostID/38/A-New-Leader-in-West--Central-Africa.aspx

Educational institutions established in 2005
2005 establishments in Nigeria
Education in Ogun State
Christian universities and colleges in Nigeria